

Michael Barkun (born April 8, 1938) is an American academic who serves as Professor Emeritus of political science at the Maxwell School of Citizenship and Public Affairs, Syracuse University, specializing in political and religious extremism and the relationship between religion and violence. He has authored a number of books on the subject, including Religion and the Racist Right: The Origins of the Christian Identity Movement (1996), A Culture of Conspiracy: Apocalyptic Visions in Contemporary America (2003), and Chasing Phantoms: Reality, Imagination, and Homeland Security Since 9/11 (2011).

Barkun has acted as a consultant for the Federal Bureau of Investigation; as a member of the Special Advisory Commission to the FBI Critical Incident Response Group from late 1995 to early 1996, he provided training and background presentations on extremist groups. He serves on the editorial boards of Terrorism and Political Violence and Nova Religio, and was the editor of Communal Societies from 1987 to 1994. He edits the Religion and Politics book series for the Syracuse University Press. He won the 2003 Distinguished Scholar award from the Communal Studies Association, and the Myers Center Award for the Study of Human Rights for his book Religion and the Racist Right.

Barkun focuses particularly on millenarian and utopian movements, terrorism and "doomsday weapons", and the contemporary influence of the Protocols of the Elders of Zion decades after it was exposed as a hoax. His books have been reviewed by The New York Times, The New York Sun, The Montana Professor, and Terrorism and Political Violence. In a 2004 review, historian Paul S. Boyer wrote that Barkun "knows his way around the arcane world of contemporary conspiracy theorists" more "than any other scholar in America".

Education
Barkun earned his Ph.D. from Northwestern University in 1965.

Research on conspiracy theories 
Barkun has classified conspiracy theories into three kinds:

 Event conspiracy theories: This refers to limited and well-defined events.  Examples may include such conspiracy theories as those concerning the assassination of J. F. Kennedy, the September 11 attacks, and the origins and spread of HIV/AIDS.
 Systemic conspiracy theories: The conspiracy is believed to have broad goals, usually conceived as securing control of a country, a region, or even the entire world. The goals are sweeping, whilst the conspiratorial machinery is generally simple: a single, evil organization implements a plan to infiltrate and subvert existing institutions. This is a common scenario in conspiracy theories that focus on the alleged machinations of Jews, Freemasons, communists, or the Catholic Church.
 Superconspiracy theories: For Barkun, such theories link multiple alleged conspiracies together hierarchically. At the summit is a distant but all-powerful evil force. His cited examples are the ideas of David Icke and Milton William Cooper.

Barkun discusses four types of groups categorized by the nature of secrecy involved: a Type 1 conspiracy theory refers to a secret group which acts secretly, and a Type 3 conspiracy theory refers to a known group which acts secretly (Types 2 and 4 lie outside of conspiracy theory).

A Culture of Conspiracy 
In his book A Culture of Conspiracy: Apocalyptic Visions in Contemporary America (2003), Barkun dives into the different characteristics of conspiracy theories. According to him, there are certain attributes that occur in every account of conspiracy. First, conspiracy negates the possibility that something could happen by chance. Nothing in a conspiracist worldview is ever due to chance. Conspiracy theories are created at the root of the statement that nothing happens by accident.

Barkun states that in this view the universe is governed by design rather than randomness, which means that there is no room for accidents, everything is intentional. Secondly, when it comes to conspiracy, nothing is as it seems. Conspiracists have to disguise their true intentions and identities through deception. Therefore, according to conspiracy theorists, the appearance of innocence means nothing. Lastly, in conspiracy, everything is connected. Working hand in hand with the claim that nothing is left up to chance, the claim that everything is connected means that patterns are created everywhere in response. Constant linkage and connection must be created to explain what may seem like accidental.

Furthermore, Barkun works to set the stage for the presence of conspiracist views that leave a large amount of questions unanswered. All three of these characteristics can be applied to both political and government conspiracies, but also more causally to all types of conspiracy theories.

Works 
 United Nations System and Its Functions: Selected Readings (1968; co-edited with Robert W. Gregg). Published in Princeton, NJ by Van Nostrand as a 460-page hardcover and paperback. A part of the Van Nostrand political science series.
 Law Without Sanctions: Order in Primitive Societies and the World Community (1968). Published by Yale University Press as a 179-page hardcover.
 International Law and the Social Sciences (1970; with Wesley L. Gould). Published by Princeton University Press as a 338-page hardcover. 
 Social Science Literature: A Bibliography for International Law (1972; with Wesley L. Gould). Published in Princeton, NJ for the American Society of International Law by Princeton University Press as a 662-page hardcover. It was republished in paperback in 2015 as part of the Princeton Legacy Library series.
 Law and the Social System (1973; as editor). Published in New York by Lieber-Atherton as a 128-page hardcover and paperback.
 Disaster and the Millennium (1974). Published in New Haven by Yale University Press as a 246-page hardcover. It was re-published in paperback in 1986 by Syracuse University Press.
 Crucible of the Millennium: Burned-Over District of New York in the 1840s (1986) Published by Syracuse University Press as a 194-page hardcover and paperback.
 Religion and the Racist Right: The Origins of the Christian Identity Movement (1994). Published in Chapel Hill, NC by The University of North Carolina Press as a 290-page hardcover and paperback. A revised edition was published in 1997 as a 330-page hardcover and paperback.
 Millennialism and Violence (1996; as editor). Published in London and Portland, OR by F. Cass as a 177-page hardcover and paperback. It was the second in the Cass series on political violence.
 Culture of Conspiracy: Apocalyptic Visions in Contemporary America (2003). Published in Berkeley, CA by University of California Press as a 243-page hardcover. It was the 15th book in the Comparative Studies in Religion and Society series. A 251-page paperback edition was published in 2006. A second edition was published in 2013 as a 320-page paperback.
 Chasing Phantoms: Reality, Imagination, and Homeland Security Since 9/11 (2011). Published by The University of North Carolina Press as a 208-page hardcover. A paperback edition was published in 2014.

References

External links
 Book Discussion on A Culture of Conspiracy. Interview by Brian Lamb on C-SPAN's Washington Journal (March 12, 2004)

1938 births
Academics and writers on far-right extremism
American political scientists
Critics of conspiracy theories
Living people
Syracuse University faculty
Researchers of new religious movements and cults
Northwestern University alumni